Emmanuel Kwasi Addae (born 1 July 1925) is a Ghanaian politician and pharmacist. He served as member of parliament for the first parliament of the second republic of Ghana for Asante-Akim North constituency representing the Ashanti Region of Ghana.

Early life and education 
Addae was born on 1 July 1925 at Agogo the Ashanti Region of Ghana. He attended Heriot-Watt College where he obtained his certificate in Nursing (Q. R. N). He later enrolled at Robert Gordon's College where he qualified as a Pharmaceutical Chemist (Ph.C.). He is a member of the Pharmaceutical Society of Great Britain.

Politics 
Addae was elected during the 1969 Ghanaian parliamentary election as member of the first parliament of the second republic of Ghana. He represented Asante-Akim North constituency on the ticket of the Progress Party (PP). He was succeeded by Nana Akuoko Sarpong during the 1979 parliamentary sitting.

Career 
Addae was a pharmacist and nurse by profession. He had also served with the military from 1943 to 1947. He was the proprietor of the New Town Pharmacy, a member of the Ghana Pharmacy and Poison Board, and a member of the Technical Committee for Drugs Standards.

Personal life 
Addae was a Christian, and married with seven children; two sons and five daughters. His hobbies included reading and gardening.

References 

1925 births
Possibly living people
Ghanaian MPs 1969–1972
Ghanaian Christians
Progress Party (Ghana) politicians
Ghanaian pharmacists
People from Ashanti Region
Alumni of Heriot-Watt University
Alumni of Robert Gordon University
20th-century Ghanaian politicians